Rochore Constituency was a constituency in Singapore that existed from 1951 until 1988. The constituency was represented in the Legislative Council from 1951 until 1955, in the Legislative Assembly from 1955 until 1965, and in Parliament from 1965 until 1988. It elected one member of Parliament.

The constituency was formed in 1951 by merging parts of the Municipal North–East Constituency and the Municipal South-West Constituency. The first election was won by Caralapati Raghaviah Dasaratha Raj of the Labour Party.

In 1955, parts of the constituency were carved out to form Cairnhill, Kampong Kapor and Stamford constituencies. The constituency was won by Tan Theng Chiang of the Labour Front.

In 1959, parts of the constituency were separated to form Crawford and Kampong Glam constituencies. It was then won by Toh Chin Chye of the People's Action Party. Toh will remain the Member of Parliament of the constituency till it merged into Kampong Glam Single Member Constituency in 1988.

Member of Parliament

Elections

Elections in the 1980s

Elections in the 1970s

Elections in the 1960s

Elections in the 1950s

Historical maps

References 

Singaporean electoral divisions